The 1999 Edo State gubernatorial election occurred in Nigeria on January 9, 1999. The PDP nominee Lucky Igbinedion won the election, defeating the APP candidate.

Lucky Igbinedion emerged PDP candidate.

Electoral system
The Governor of Edo State is elected using the plurality voting system.

Primary election

PDP primary
The PDP primary election was won by Lucky Igbinedion.

Results
The total number of registered voters in the state was 1,414,511. Total number of votes cast was 827,563, while number of valid votes was 815,554. Rejected votes were 12,009.

References 

Edo State gubernatorial elections
Edo State gubernatorial election
Edo State gubernatorial election
Edo State gubernatorial election